XHAB-TDT, virtual channel 8 (UHF digital channel 30), is a Televisa television station licensed to Matamoros, Tamaulipas, Mexico. The channel can also be seen in Texas' Rio Grande Valley market. In addition to local news and programming, XHAB also airs a selection of Nu9ve's programming. XHAB also shares a sales office with XERV-TV in McAllen, Texas, for sales of commercial time from American businesses.

XHAB returned channel 7 to the air in Matamoros upon signing on in 1968; the channel had been occupied by XELD-TV in the early 1950s.

Grenade attacks
The television station has been attacked twice, once in July 2009 and again on August 15, 2010. No one was injured, but two automobiles were damaged.

References

External links
 Televisa Tamaulipas website

Televisa Regional
Mass media in Matamoros, Tamaulipas
Television stations in the Lower Rio Grande Valley